Other than the many gods and goddesses of the Slavs, the ancient Slavs believed in and revered many supernatural beings that existed in nature. These supernatural beings in Slavic religion come in various forms, and the same name of any single being can be spelled or transliterated differently according to language and transliteration system.

Vila 

Vila (pl. vile, Slovak/Czech víly) is a fairy that is similar to a nymph, identified as a nymph by the Greek historian Procopius; their name comes from the same root as the name of Veles. They are described as beautiful, eternally young, dressed in white, with eyes flashing like thunders, and provided with wings, and blonde hair. They live in the clouds, in mountain woods or in the waters. They are well-disposed towards men, and can to turn themselves into horses, wolves, snakes, falcons and swans. The cult of the Vilas was still practised among South Slavs in the early twentieth century, with offerings of fruits and flowers in caves, cakes near wells, and ribbons hung from the branches of trees.

Rusalka

In Slavic mythology, Rusalka is a water nymph, a female spirit who lives in rivers. In most versions, rusalka is an unquiet being who is no longer alive, associated with the unclean spirit (Nav) and dangerous. According to Dmitry Zelenin, people who die violently and before their time, such as young women who commit suicide because they have been jilted by their lovers, or unmarried women who are pregnant out of wedlock, must live out their designated time on earth as a spirit. Another theory is that rusalki are the female spirits of the unclean dead; this includes suicides, unbaptised babies, and those who die without last rites. (Under this theory, male unclean dead were said to become vodianoi.)

Vodianoi, Vodník

The vodianoi is a male water spirit of Slavic origin. The Czech and Slovak equivalent is called a vodník, Polish is a wodnik, in Russian it is vodianoy and vodyanyk in Ukrainian. A South Slavic equivalent is vodenjak. He is viewed to be particularly malevolent, existing almost exclusively to drown swimmers who have angered him by their boldness. Reports of his appearance vary; some tales define him as a naked old man, bloated and hairy, covered in slime, covered in scales, or simply as an old peasant with a red shirt and beard. He is also reported to have the ability to transform into a fish.

The vodianoi lives in deep pools, often by a mill, and is said to be the spirit of unclean male dead (this definition includes those who have committed suicide, unbaptized children, and those who die without last rites). As previously stated, the vodianoi would drown those who angered him with boasts or insults. However, there was no certain protection, as the spirit was particularly capricious. Peasants feared the vodianoi and would often attempt to get rid of the spirit or, failing that, appease him.

The only people who were generally safe from the vodianoi's anger were millers and fishermen. Millers in particular were viewed to be so close to the vodianoi that they often became seen as sorcerous figures. This may be influenced by the belief that millers yearly drown a drunk passerby as an offering to the vodianoi. Fishermen were somewhat less suspect, offering only the first of their catch with an incantation. If a vodianoi favored a fisherman, he would herd fish into the nets.

Bereginya

Bereginyas (Russian), Berehynias (Ukrainian) or Brzeginias (Polish) are obscure fairies mentioned in "The Lay of St. Gregory the Theologian of the Idols", which has been preserved in a 15th-century Novgorod manuscript. "The Lay" is a compilation of translations from Greek sources studded with comments by a 12th-century Kievan monk. The text, which seems to have been considerably revised by later scribes, does mention "vampires and bereginyas" as the earliest creatures worshipped by the Slavs, even before the cult of Perun was introduced in their lands. No detail about "bereginyas" are given, affording a large field for speculations of every kind.

Boris Rybakov connects the term with the Slavic word for "riverbank" and reasons that the term referred to Slavic mermaids, although, unlike rusalkas, they were benevolent in nature. The scholar identifies the worship of vampires and bereginyas as a form of "dualistic animism" practiced by the Slavs in the most ancient period of their history. According to him, the term was replaced by "rusalka" in most areas, surviving into the 20th century only in the Russian North. After the publication of Rybakov's research, the "bereginya" has become a popular concept with Slavic neo-pagans who conceive of it as a powerful pagan goddess rather than a mere water sprite.

Modern fiction

 The Winternight trilogy, by Katherine Arden, is inspired by Slavic mythology and includes many characters, such as the Domovoi, the Rusalka and other beings.
 In Edward Fallon's second book in his Linger series of novels, Trail of the Beast, a rusalka taunts a trio hunting a serial killer.
 C. J. Cherryh has written three novels, Rusalka, Chernevog and Yvgenie, set in a world inspired by Russian folktales that feature, amongst others, rusalka, vodianoi, and leshyi.
 In Changes, a novel in the Dresden Files series by Jim Butcher, the fairy Toot-Toot, a Polevoi, is enraged when he is mistakenly called a Domovoi by Sanya, the Russian Knight of the Cross.
 The videogame Quest For Glory IV: Shadows of Darkness, set in the Slavic countryside of a fictional east-European valley, features several Slavic fairies, including the Rusalka, Domovoi, and Leshy.
 Catherynne Valente's novel Deathless is set in a fantasy version of Stalinist Russia and features vila, rusalka, leshy, and other Slavic fairies.
 Dorothy Dreyer's Reaper's Rite series depicts Vila as magical beings of half-faery, half-witch origin.
 In J. K. Rowling's novel Harry Potter and the Goblet of Fire, Veela are the mascots of the Bulgarian Quidditch Team at the World Cup. Fleur Delacour's grandmother was a Veela and Fleur's wand contains a strand of a veela hair.
 Piers Anthony's Xanth novels include a few Vily, as nature spirits bound to a tree (similar to a dryad) with powers of shapeshifting and cleansing or poisoning water, and extremely quick to anger.
 Andrzej Sapkowski's Wiedźmin series as well as the Witcher video games based on it are set in a medieval Slavic fantasy world. Many of the monsters are taken directly from or inspired by Slavic mythology, such as the rusalka, the striga, and the vodyanoi.

Mythical characters, spirits, and creatures 
As is common in folklore, there is no standard set of characteristics, or names, and spirits or magical creatures are referred to by many names, often identifying their function or the place or environment of their activity.
Such descriptive terms include:

Tutelary deity

 Bannik (banya, sauna)
 Bolotnik (swamp)
 Dvorovoi (yard, land)
 Leshy (forest)
 Sea Tsar (sea)
 Mermaid (sea)
 Moryana (Caspian Sea)
 Ovinnik (barn)
 Polevik (field in agriculture)
 The Mistress of the Copper Mountain (ore, Ural)
 Shubin (coal, Donbass)
 Vodyanoy (lake, river)

Spirits of Atmosphere

  (frost)
 Vedogon (spirit-guardian of a sleeping person)
 Vikhor (wind, whirlwind)
 Zduhać (protector from bad weather)

Spirits of the time of day

 Babay  (night) 
 Poludnitsa (noon)
 Nocnitsa (night)
 Zorya (morning)

Spirits of the sky

 Dennitsa (morning star)
 Veczernitsa (evening star)

Spirit of Fate

 Dola (destiny fortune)
 Likho (misfortune)
 Narecnitsi, or Rodjenice, Sudjenice (parcae)

Nav

 Drekavac (nav of the southern Slavs)
 Kikimora (harmful domestic female spirit) 
 Mavka (evil spirits, rusalkas)
 Rusalka (the harmful spirit that appears in the summer in the grass field, in the forest, near the water)
 Samovila (a female spirit inhabiting the mountains and owning wells and lakes)
 Upyr (vampire)

Devilry (evil power)
 Bies
 Chort
 Chuhaister
 Korov'ya smert' (Cow's death)
 Kallikantzaros
 Likhoradka
 Shishiga
 Zlydzens

Ritual characters
 Berehynia (East Slavic mythology female character)
 Baba Marta (mythical female character in Bulgarian folklore, associated with the month of March. Martenitsa)
 Božić (Christmas holiday near the southern Slavs)
 Dodola (in the Balkan tradition, the spring-summer rite of causing rain, as well as the central character of this rite)
 German (ritual doll and the name of the rite of calling out rain of the southern Slavs)
 Jarilo (personification of one of the summer holidays in the Russian folk calendar)
 Koliada (the personification of the New Year's cycle)
 Kostroma (spring-summer ritual character in traditional Russian culture)
 Kupala (folklore character of the Eastern Slavs, the personification of the holiday of Kupala Night)
 Marzanna (the female mythological character associated with the seasonal rituals of dying and the resurrection of nature)
 Maslenitsa (folklore character of the Eastern Slavs, the personification of the holiday of Maslenitsa)

See also

 Mermaid
 Naiad
 Nix (or Nyx)
 Nymph
 Samodiva
 Water sprite
 Czech folklore
 Rusalka

References

Further reading
 Linda Ivanits, Russian Folk Belief. Armonk, N.Y. and London: M.E. Sharpe, 1989.
 Власова, М. Новая абевега русских суеверий. Иллюстрированный словарь. Санкт Петербург: Северо-Запад. 1995
 Wilkinson, Philip Illustrated Dictionary of Mythology (1998)
 Зеленин, Дмитрий Константинович. Очерки русской мифологии: Умершие неестественною смертью и русалки. Москва: Индрик. 1995.
 Conrad, Joseph L. 2000. “Female Spirits Among the South Slavs”. In: FOLKLORICA - Journal of the Slavic, East European, and Eurasian Folklore Association 5 (2): 27-34. https://doi.org/10.17161/folklorica.v5i2.3652.
 Conrad, Joseph L. 2001. “Male Mythological Beings Among the South Slavs”. In: FOLKLORICA - Journal of the Slavic, East European, and Eurasian Folklore Association 6 (1): 3-9. https://doi.org/10.17161/folklorica.v6i1.3699.
 Radenković, Ljubinko. "South Slavic Folk Demonology Between East and West". In: Српска народна култура између Истока и Запада [Serbian Folk Culture between East and West]. Belgrade:  Балканолошки институт Српске академије наука и уметности, 2014. pp. 9–42. . (in Serbian)

Fairies
Slavic neopaganism

Slavic mythology